Thomas Middleton Dantzler is an American politician.

Dantzler is a native of Orangeburg County, South Carolina, where he was born on June 6, 1941 to parents Harold and Leila. He completed a Doctor of Veterinary Medicine degree in 1965 from the University of Georgia and served two years in the United States Air Force, until 1967. Between 1979 and 1981, Dantzler was a member of the Berkeley County Council. He graduated from Clemson University with a bachelor of science in 1982. Between 1995 and 2009, Dantzler was a member of the South Carolina House of Representatives, serving House District 117 as a Republican. Dantzler was succeeded in office by Tim Scott.

References

1941 births
Living people
People from Orangeburg County, South Carolina
People from Berkeley County, South Carolina
20th-century American politicians
21st-century American politicians
South Carolina Republicans
United States Air Force airmen
University of Georgia alumni
Clemson University alumni
American veterinarians
Male veterinarians